Caritas St. Joseph Secondary School is vocational training secondary school in Tsing Yi Estate, Tsing Yi Island, Hong Kong. It was formerly, Caritas St. Joseph Prevocational School, a prevocational school established in Tsuen Wan by Caritas Hong Kong in 1971 and moved to the island in 1989. It was changed to its current name when the curriculum changed in 2001.

External links
 Official Website

Educational institutions established in 1971
Tsing Yi
Secondary schools in Hong Kong
Caritas Hong Kong
Catholic secondary schools in Hong Kong